Osmunda claytoniites is an extinct fern in the genus Osmunda, very similar to the extant fern Osmunda claytoniana.  It has been found in the Upper Triassic of Antarctica.

References

Osmundales
Triassic plants